Pavel Valeryevich Sitko (born 17 December 1985) is a Belarusian former international football midfielder.

Career
He has played for the Belarus national team from 2008 till 2013. Sitko scored his first goal for the national team against England in Minsk on 15 October 2008, in a World Cup qualifier.

Honours
Shakhtyor Soligorsk
Belarusian Cup winner: 2013–14

International goals
Scores and results list Belarus' goal tally first.

External links
 
 

1985 births
Living people
People from Rechytsa
Belarusian footballers
Association football midfielders
Belarus international footballers
FC Rechitsa-2014 players
FC Vitebsk players
FC Shakhtyor Soligorsk players
FC Gomel players
FC Slavia Mozyr players
Sportspeople from Gomel Region